János Lukács (also known as Ioan Lucaci; 1 November 1946 – 6 March 2016) was a Romanian professional footballer of Hungarian ethnicity. Lukács grew up in his hometown at the local side, Forestierul Tileagd, then in 1965 moved to Divizia A club Crișul Oradea, for which he made its debut in the top-flight.

Lukács played in 145 top-flight matches and scored 3 goals in the "red-white-blues" kits of FC Bihor (as Crișul was renamed in 1972).  During the 1960s and 1970s, he was considered one of the most powerful defenders in the Romanian league and was part of the FC Bihor's golden team, together with players such as: Attila Kun, Árpád Szűcs, Paul Popovici, Cornel Georgescu, Nicolae Florescu, Alexandru Nagy, Cornel Lupău or Alexandru Gergely, among many others.

Honours
Bihor Oradea
Divizia B: 1970–71, 1974–75

References

External links
János Lukács at labtof.ro

1946 births
2016 deaths
People from Bihor County
Romanian footballers
Romanian sportspeople of Hungarian descent
Association football defenders
Liga I players
Liga II players
FC Bihor Oradea players